Out of All This Blue is the twelfth studio album by The Waterboys, released by BMG in 2017 and produced by Mike Scott. The album reached No. 8 on the UK Albums Chart and No. 3 on the UK Independent Albums Chart.

In a press release for the album, Scott commented: "Out Of All This Blue is 2/3 love and romance, 1/3 stories and observations. I knew from the beginning I wanted to make a double album, and lucky for me – and I hope the listener – the songs just kept coming, and in pop colours."

"If The Answer Is Yeah" was released as the album's first single in July 2017. A music video was filmed for the track, directed by Yoni Weisberg and starring Clive Russell and Sharon Elder. Videos were also made for "Payo Payo Chin" and "Mister Charisma".

Critical reception

Upon release, Mark Deming of AllMusic stated: "There's an eclectic variety of sounds and genres here, but the majority of the album finds Scott and company belatedly embracing dance rhythms, and he takes to the funk more comfortably than one might expect. Out of All This Blue is a bold experiment that succeeds, and once again demonstrates the depth and breadth of Mike Scott's talent." Terry Staunton of Record Collector wrote: "The ambition and scope of these songs is undeniably impressive. This is Scott the melting pot throwing everything into the mix, with no restrictions or boundaries as to what pours out of his brightly shining brain. And that's very big of him."

Andy Gill of The Independent considered the album to "continue the funkier direction taken on 2015's Modern Blues". Martin Townsend of The Express described Out of All This Blue as having "an edge and funkiness to proceedings with barely a weak track". Ian Rushbury of PopMatters praised the album's lyrical content but was critical of the number of tracks and "Celtic-Hip-Hop-Indie-Dance" production. He wrote: "The idea of Scott working with hip-hop production techniques is really interesting and there still could be a brilliant Waterboys album using this approach. Unfortunately Out of All This Blue isn't it."

Track listing

Personnel

 Mike Scott – vocals, guitar, piano, keyboards, organ, mellotron, bass, drums, percussion, FX, sampler
 Zach Ernst, Niall C. Lawlor, Max Zaska – guitar
 Brother Paul Brown – synthesiser, organ, piano, clavinet, vocals
 John Hegarty – piano
 Steve Wickham – fiddle, sonics, horns, strings
 David Hood, Aonghus Ralston, Neil Mahoney – bass
 Megumi Igarashi – voice
 Ralph Salmins – drums
 Wild Bill Crivvens – percussion
 Trey Pollard – string, brass and bass arrangement
 The Indivisible Strings – strings
 Kevin Murphy – cello, double bass
 Bill Blackmore – trumpet and flugelhorn
 Thomas Haugh – zither, ukulele, percussion
 Caoimhe Barry, Conor J. Ryan, Dublin Soul Choir, Karen Crowley, Saoirse Duane, Carly Coonagh – choir
 Zeenie Summers, Jess Kavanagh – backing vocals, choir

Production
 Mike Scott – producer, editing
 Stephen Shannon, Kevin Murphy, Thomas Haugh – producers (CD2 tracks 2, 11)
 Dave Montuyrobles – engineer
 Adrian Olsen – recording of string and brass sessions
 Bob Clearmountain – mixing (CD1 tracks 1-2, 5-6, 7-8, CD2 tracks 1, 3, 5-7, 12-13)
 Puck Fingers – mixing (CD1 tracks 3-4, 7, 9-10, CD2 tracks 2, 4-5, 8-11, CD3 tracks 1-8, 10-11)
 Terry Gabis – live desk mixing (CD3 track 9)
 Brother Paul – mixing (CD3 track 10)

Other
 Camille O'Sullivan – cover photography
 Paul Mac Manus, Steve Wickham – additional photography
 Mike Scott – cover concept, additional photography
 Ian Ross – design, artwork

Charts

References

2017 albums
The Waterboys albums